Egbert "Bert" Roach (August 21, 1891 – February 16, 1971) was an American film actor. He appeared in more than 320 films between 1914 and 1951. He was born in Washington, D.C., and died in Los Angeles, California, age 79.

Selected filmography

 Fatty's Magic Pants (1914 short) - Party Guest (uncredited)
 Yankee Doodle in Berlin (1919) - Von Hindenburg
 Salome vs. Shenandoah (1919) - Actor/Soldier
 Down on the Farm (1920) - Roach - the Farmer
 Married Life (1920) - Minor Role (uncredited)
 A Small Town Idol (1921) - Martin Brown
 The Rowdy (1921) -Howard Morse
 The Millionaire (1921) - Bobo Harmsworth
 The Black Bag (1922) - Mulready
 The Flirt (1922) - Wade Trumble
 A Lady of Quality (1924) - Sir Christopher Crowell
 The Storm Daughter (1924) - Olaf Swensen
 Excitement (1924) - Toby
 High Speed (1924) - Dick Farrell
 The Turmoil (1924) - Minor Role (uncredited)
 Don't (1925)
 The Denial (1925)
 Money Talks (1926)
 The Flaming Forest (1926)
 The Taxi Dancer (1927)
 Tillie the Toiler (1927)
 The Battle of the Century (1927)
 Wickedness Preferred (1928)
 The Crowd (1928)
 Under the Black Eagle (1928)
 Riders of the Dark (1928)
 Honeymoon (1928)
 Young Nowheres (1929)
 So Long Letty (1929)
 The Show of Shows (1929)
 No No Nanette (1930)
 Hold Everything (1930)
 Bad Sister (1931)
 Six Cylinder Love (1931)
 Murders in the Rue Morgue (1932)
 Impatient Maiden (1932)
 Night World (1932)
 Bird of Paradise (1932)
 The Pride of the Legion (1932)
 Hallelujah, I'm a Bum (1933)
Secret Sinners (1933)
 Daring Daughters (1933)
 Easy Millions (1933)
 Half a Sinner (1934)
Marrying Widows  (1934)   
 Guard That Girl (1935)
 San Francisco (1936)
 Prescription for Romance (1937)
 Mannequin (1937)
 Algiers (1938)
 Romance on the Run (1938)
 The Man in the Iron Mask (1939)
 Mardi Gras (1943)
 The Strange Love of Martha Ivers (1946)
 Decoy (1946)
 The Time, the Place and the Girl (1946)
 The Perils of Pauline (1947)
 Dick Tracy Meets Gruesome (1947)

References

External links

1891 births
1971 deaths
American male film actors
American male silent film actors
20th-century American male actors